SM7 may refer to:
 SM postcode area number 7 in the United Kingdom
 Shure SM7 broadcasting microphone